Panmana  is a village in Kollam district in the state of Kerala, India.

Demographics
As of the 2011 Indian census, Panmana had a population of 50001.

See also
 St Andrew's Church, Kovilthottam

References 

Villages in Kollam district